Derrin Schlesinger is a British producer, known for producing The IT Crowd, Nathan Barley, The Book Group and Fur TV. In 2007 she was nominated for the BAFTA TV Award for The IT Crowd which was nominated for the Situation Comedy Award.

Filmography
 Four Lions (2010)
 33X Around the Sun (2005)
 Mule (2002)
 Mudchute (2001)
 To Have and to Hold (2000)

Videography
 Hefner - The Sweetness Lies Within (1998)

Television
 Babylon (2014)
 Southcliffe (2013)
 Noel Fielding's Luxury Comedy (2012)
 Octavia (2009)
 Fur TV (2008)
 The IT Crowd (2007–2008)
 Ladies and Gentlemen (2007)
 Nathan Barley (2005)
 The Book Group (2003)

External links 
 

British film producers
Year of birth missing (living people)
British television producers
Living people